The 47th General Assembly of Prince Edward Island was in session from October 23, 1951, to April 27, 1955. The Liberal Party led by John Walter Jones formed the government. Alexander Wallace Matheson replaced Jones as Premier and party leader in 1953.

Forest W. Phillips was elected speaker.

There were five sessions of the 47th General Assembly:

Members

Kings

Prince

Queens

Notes:

References
  Election results for the Prince Edward Island Legislative Assembly, 1951-04-26
 O'Handley, Kathryn Canadian Parliamentary Guide, 1994 

Terms of the General Assembly of Prince Edward Island
1951 establishments in Prince Edward Island
1955 disestablishments in Prince Edward Island